Eddie Thomson (25 February 1947 – 21 February 2003) was a Scottish association football player and coach, who played as a defender. He played for Heart of Midlothian and Aberdeen in Scotland, San Antonio Thunder in the United States and Sydney City in Australia. Staying in Australia, he coached Sydney City and Sydney Olympic before working with the Australia national team. Initially assistant coach, he was subsequently head coach from 1990 to 1996. His last coaching position was with Sanfrecce Hiroshima in Japan.

Career
Born in Rosewell, Scotland, he played 162 games for Heart of Midothian from 1966 to 1973, before moving to Aberdeen and playing a further 91 games with them. After a brief stint with the San Antonio Thunder of the NASL, he moved to Australia and Sydney City in 1977 for the inaugural National Soccer League season. He won two NSL championships with this side as a player, in 1977 and as a player-coach again in 1980. During his time at Hearts he also played for the Scottish u-23 side.

It was at this time he retired from playing and immediately became the full-time coach of Sydney City, winning a further two national championships in 1981 and 1982. He also won an NSL Cup trophy in 1986. After Sydney City withdrew from the NSL in 1987 he took charge of Sydney Olympic, guiding them to a grand final in 1989 before leaving early in the next season to take charge of the Australia national team.

His national coaching career did not start there however. He became coach of Australia B in 1984 before becoming assistant coach of the Socceroos in 1985. After taking over as Socceroos manager, he guided the team to some impressive friendly results against Sweden and the USA before coming close to qualifying for USA 94, only losing 1–0 as a result of a freak deflection to an Argentine side who had recalled Diego Maradona after some disappointing qualification results.

He was also coach of the Australian Olympic football team at the same time. In 1992, after defeating the Netherlands in a memorable encounter to qualify for the 1992 Summer Olympics, the team came within one game of the gold medal match, losing 6–1 to Poland before losing 1–0 to Ghana in the bronze medal playoff.

In 1994, after allegations of inappropriate involvement in player transfers, an inquiry, chaired by retired New South Wales judge Donald Stewart, was set up to investigate these claims. The report published recommended his sacking, but he stayed on in the end. Shortly after guiding the Olympic side through the 1996 Summer Olympics in which Australia failed to get past the group stage, Eddie resigned to take charge of Japanese side Sanfrecce Hiroshima. During his time there, a number of Australians, such as Aurelio Vidmar, Graham Arnold and Steve Corica also played there.

Honours

Player 
 Heart of Midlothian
Scottish Cup Runners-up: 1967–68

Sydney City
National Soccer League: 1977, 1980

Manager 
Sydney City
National Soccer League: 1980, 1981, 1982
NSL Northern Division: 1984, 1985
NSL Cup: 1986

Sydney Olympic
National Soccer League Runners-up: 1986
NSL Minor Premiership Runners-up: 1986
NSL Cup: Runners-up: 1989

Australia
OFC Nations Cup: 1996
Trans-Tasman Cup: 1991, 1995

Individual
NSL Coach of the Year: 1981, 1984, 1985
National Soccer Hall of Fame: 2002 Inductee

Death
He returned to Australia in 2000 and shortly afterwards, he was diagnosed with Non-Hodgkin lymphoma, which he died of in 2003.

Managerial statistics

References

External links
Eddie Thomson at Aussie Footballers
 

1947 births
2003 deaths
Sportspeople from Midlothian
Scottish footballers
Scottish expatriate footballers
Penicuik Athletic F.C. players
Aberdeen F.C. players
Heart of Midlothian F.C. players
Hakoah Sydney City East FC players
Scottish Football League players
Australian soccer coaches
Australia national soccer team managers
J1 League managers
Sanfrecce Hiroshima managers
Expatriate football managers in Japan
Deaths from non-Hodgkin lymphoma
San Antonio Thunder players
North American Soccer League (1968–1984) players
Expatriate soccer players in the United States
Scottish expatriate sportspeople in the United States
Scottish expatriate football managers
Deaths from cancer in New South Wales
National Soccer League (Australia) players
Sydney Olympic FC managers
Scottish emigrants to Australia
Scottish Football League representative players
Scotland under-23 international footballers
Association football defenders
Scottish expatriate sportspeople in Australia
Scottish expatriate sportspeople in Japan
Hakoah Sydney City East FC managers